Jirko Malchárek (born 28 June 1966 in Jeseník) is a former Minister of Economy of Slovakia, former deputy prime minister of Slovakia and former racing driver.

Life and career
Malchárek was educated in technical field and graduated at the Slovak University of Technology in Bratislava.

He was in the Slovak National Council from 1998 to 2006, initially for the Party of Civic Understanding (Strana občianskeho porozumenia) and from 2002 as a member of the Alliance of the New Citizen, of which he is a founding member. In September 2005 he abandoned Alliance of the New Citizen and became a member of Nádej (English: Hope), which did not get into parliament in the 2006 elections.

He is interested in automobile racing and raced for 11 years, including occasional forays into international racing, such as the FIA GT Championship, and in 2002 he was a test driver of Minardi. He is a co-founder of BECEP, organization dedicated to safety of automobile traffic.

References

External links
 http://www.government.gov.sk/english/minister_mh.html (page about current minister, archived version about Jirko Malchárek)
 http://www.leaders.sk/index.php?id=788&lang=en

1966 births
Living people
People from Jeseník
Government ministers of Slovakia
Hope (political party) politicians
Idea (political party) politicians
24 Hours of Spa drivers
Slovak racing drivers
Slovak University of Technology in Bratislava alumni

ISR Racing drivers
FIA GT Championship drivers
W Racing Team drivers